Oruku is a community in Enugu State, Nigeria.

Government 
The local government is Nkanu East LGA of Enugu State.

Demographics

Language 
The de facto language is the language of the Ibo tribe.

Population 
Oruku's population, according to the 2006 census, is 12,569

References

Populated places in Enugu State